Brierdene was to have been a railway station on the Collywell Bay Branch Line and construction began in 1913 and was abandoned in 1914. The station was to have had two platforms and served by the North Eastern Railway.

References

Unbuilt railway stations in the United Kingdom
Disused railway stations in Northumberland
Former North Eastern Railway (UK) stations